Louis Crato, Count of Nassau-Saarbrücken (28 March 1663, Saarbrücken – 14 February 1713 in Saarbrücken) was the son of Count Gustav Adolph of Nassau-Saarbrücken and Clara Eleanor, Countess of Hohenlohe-Neuenstein.  He was educated at Neuenstein with his uncle, Count Wolfgang Julius of Hohenlohe-Neuenstein, and later in Tübingen.  His father was at the time a prisoner of war in France.

On his father's death in 1677, he inherited the counties of Saarbrücken and Saarwerden.  He could not take up the administration of his territories, because they were occupied by the French. It was probably the search for adventure and the lack of opportunities that led him to enter the French service.  He reached the rank of lieutenant general there. During his career, he was distinguished by bravery, coolness and military acumen.  He took part in the siege and capture of Luxembourg in 1684.  During the Nine Years' War he served in the Netherlands Company at the Battle of Fleurus (1690) (severely wounded), the siege of Namur, the Battle of Steenkerke (1692), and the Battle of Neerwinden (1693).  The French King rewarded this short spell with the Dutch army by seizing his lands.  After the Treaty of Ryswick in 1697, his lands were returned to him and he became Regent.  During the War of the Spanish Succession he only served in an advisory role.

He was considered a good ruler, as he could keep his country out of further wars.  He organized the administration of justice and the state finances.  He showed benevolence and reorganized the school system.

He was succeeded in government by his brother Charles Louis.

Marriage and issue 
On 25 April 1699 he married Countess Philippine Henriette of Hohenlohe-Langenburg (1679–1751), daughter of Count Henry Frederick of Hohenlohe-Langenburg. They had the following children:

 Eliza (1700–1712)
 Eleonora Dorothea (1701–1702)
 Henriette (1702–1769)
 Caroline (1704–1774)
 married Count Palatine Christian III
 Louise Henriette (6 December 1705 – 28 October 1766)
 married Prince Frederick Charles of Stolberg-Gedern (1693–1767)
 Eleonore (1 July 1707 – 15 October 1769)
 married Count Louis of Hohenlohe-Langenburg
 Louis (1709–1710)
 Christina (1711–1712)

References 
 

House of Nassau
1663 births
1713 deaths
Counts of Nassau-Saarbrücken